The Alzou is a  river in the Aveyron department in southern France. It is a right tributary of the Aveyron. Its source is in Goutrens. It flows into the Aveyron in Villefranche-de-Rouergue.

References

Rivers of France
Rivers of Occitania (administrative region)
Rivers of Aveyron